Tulle gras (French, "oily tulle") or tulle gras dressing is a type of bandage commonly used in France, although the term is also used in English. It consists of fabric impregnated with soft paraffin oil (98 parts), balsam of Peru (1 part), and olive oil (1 part), which prevents its sticking to wounds, but means that it needs to be used in combination with another absorbent dressing.

It is used to make inadine.

References

Further reading
"THE "TULLE GRAS" TYPE OF DRESSING AND ITS VALUE IN SURGERY". LIEUTENANT D.:A. BEATTIE

First aid
Medical dressings